Padma Shri Kaithapram Damodaran Namboothiri, popularly known as Kaithapram, is a Malayalam lyricist, poet, music director, actor, singer, screenwriter, music therapist and performer of Carnatic music. He debuted with the movie Ennennum Kannettante in 1986. He won the Kerala State Film Award for Best Lyricist two times. He was awarded India's fourth-highest civilian honor Padma Shri in 2021 by the Government of India for his contribution to the field of art.

Life and career

Kaithapram Damodaran Namboothiri was born as the eldest son of Keshavan Namboothiri (popularly known as Kannadi Bhagavathar, a disciple of Chembai Vaidyanatha Bhagavatar) and Aditi Antharjanam in Kaithapram village in Payyanur Taluk of  Kannur district of Kerala, on 4 August 1950 and he is currently residing in Thiruvannur in Kozhikode District. He has four siblings, among whom the youngest, Kaithapram Viswanathan, was also a popular Carnatic musician and music director. Kaithapram village is famous for maintaining old vedic traditions. He got his Veda education from his grandfather.  Later on he continued his education under well-known gurus (teachers) including Pazhassi Thamburan (a descendant of Pazhassi Raja) and SVS Narayanan.  He pursued his studies in acting and music at Natyagruha.

He is married to Devi Antharjanam who is the daughter of late actor Unnikrishnan Namboothiri; they have two children, Deepankuran and Devadarshan. His elder son Deepankuran is a Music composer as well as singer who has composed Music for various films.  Kaithapram Damodaran's youngest brother, Kaithapram Viswanathan, is a Malayalam cinema music director who runs the Sruthilaya Music School at Payyanur.

Kaithapram made his entry into Malayalam cinema as a lyricist for the song Devadundubhi Sandralayam in the film Ennennum Kannettante which was directed by Fazil and music composed by Jerry Amaldev and all of the songs become popular Since then he has written lyrics for more than 346 films. He has also acted in many films, including Swathithirunal, Aryan, His Highness Abdulla, and the film Theerthadanam, based on the story of famous Malayalam writer M.T. Vasudevan Nair.  He has played the character of a classical or semi-classical singer in most of the films. The songs from Desadanam, his first film as a music composer, were a hit.  The film Sopanam, directed by Shri Jayaraj, was based on a story and screenplay written by Kaithapram.

Kaithapram has established a cherished position in the Malayali heart with his beautiful yet simple artistic renderings. He has written both prose and poems and his books are also widely accepted. His appeal is closer to younger hearts and the success of Kanner Poovinte has brought this aspect into fresh focus. His lyrics often express the deep love and regard that make the average Malayali home sick. He sings in public concerts and for various causes. He has won several awards as a lyricist. His charming and helpful attitude, readiness to help and ability to be one among the music lovers, have made him a legend in his own time.

As a lyricist, Kaithapram made songs with almost all major music composers of his time. But, most of his popular songs were composed by Johnson. The duo made songs for around 35 films, and most of them have superhit songs. He also made numerous songs with Mohan Sithara, Raveendran, Ouseppachan, S. P. Venkatesh, Vidyasagar, Jassie Gift and so on.

Shri Kaithapram is also the Managing Trustee of Swathithirunal Kala Kendram (Music School) at Kozhikode, which caters to more than 400 music students. He has received numerous awards from various government and cultural organisations in Kerala. He has popularised and promoted the application of music for therapeutic purposes through the Music Therapy Foundation. Many have benefited from the systematic music therapy sessions conducted all over Kerala.

Discography

Awards 
Kerala State Film Award

 1993 – Paithrukam
 1996 – Azhakiya Ravanan

Filmfare Awards South
1996 - Best Music Director : Deshadanam
1997 - Best Music Director : Kaliyattam

Asianet Film Awards
 2005 –  Best Lyricist Award –Anandabhadram

Padma Shri 2021 
The Ministry of Home Affairs announced the Padma Awards 2021 on 25 January 2021 one of the highest civilian awards of the country on the evening of 72nd Republic Day and Kaithapram was awarded India's fourth-highest civilian honor Padma Shri for his contribution to the field of art. The award is officially announced by Indian President Ram Nath Kovind.

References
 Ear to a cure
The website of Kaithapram Damodaran Namboothiri
healing touch of music(The Hindu)
The Hindu Friday, Aug 12, 2005
Kaithapram
Hits of Kaithapram
Kaithapram Damodaran Namboothiri

External links

Malayalam-language lyricists
Malayali people
People from Kannur district
Kerala State Film Award winners
Living people
Malayalam film directors
1950 births
Film musicians from Kerala
Screenwriters from Kerala
Poets from Kerala
20th-century Indian poets
21st-century Indian poets
20th-century Indian composers
21st-century Indian composers